Eights may refer to:

 James Eights (1798–1882), American physician, scientist, and artist
 Eights Coast, portion of the coast of West Antarctica
 Eights Station, American research station in Antarctica, operated from 1963 to 1965
 Crazy Eights, a card game
 Eight (rowing), a rowing shell for eight people plus coxswain
 Eights Week, a four-day regatta of bumps races at the University of Oxford

See also
 8S (disambiguation)
 Eight (disambiguation)